Elsie Harris was a British track and field athlete.

Athletics career
She competed for England in the high jump at the 1934 British Empire Games in London.

References

English female high jumpers
Athletes (track and field) at the 1934 British Empire Games
Commonwealth Games competitors for England